Sigurd of Norway may refer to:
Sigurd Syr
Sigurd I of Norway
Sigurd II of Norway
Sigurd Lavard
Sigurd Slembe
Sigurd Magnusson
Sigurd Markusfostre
Sigurd Ribbung